The Los Angeles Blades were a professional inline hockey team based in Los Angeles, California. The Blades played in Roller Hockey International from 1993–1997 and played their home games at the Great Western Forum.

Two other franchises have used the name Los Angeles Blades: the Pacific Hockey League team in 1978–79 and the Western Hockey League team from 1961 to 1967.

Franchise history
The Blades were one of 12 original RHI teams and were owned by Jeanie Buss, daughter of then-Los Angeles Lakers owner Jerry Buss. They played a summer schedule at the Great Western Forum, which was then the home of the NBA's Lakers and the NHL's Los Angeles Kings. RHI suspended operations after the 1997 season, and when it returned in 1999, with eight teams, the Blades were not among them. RHI folded, for good, after the 1999 season.

Season-by-season record

References

 
Roller Hockey International teams
Sports clubs established in 1993
Sports clubs disestablished in 1997
1993 establishments in California
1997 disestablishments in California